(born October 17, 1992 in Izumi, Kagoshima) is a Japanese gravure idol and actress who won "Miss Magazine 2008".

Filmography

Drama 
 Akai Ito (2008) as Sara Nakagawa
 Tokyo Girls (2008)
 Nadeshiko Tai (2008) as Reiko Torihama
 Ghost Town no Hana (2009) as Shiori Yanagawa
 Twin Spica (2009) as Asumi Kamogawa
 Koishite Akuma: Vampire Boy (2009) as Kaori Takagi
 Boku to Star no 99 Nichi (2011) as Namiki Momo
 Last Hope (2013) as Maki Tokita
 The Limit (2013) as Mizuki Konno
 Miss Pilot (2013) as Suzu Abeno
 Silentpoor (2014) as Manaka
 Hatashiai (2015) as Miya
 Contrail (2016) as Keiko
 Segodon (2018) as Saigō Koto
 Scarlet (2019–20) as Naoko
 13 (2020) as Yuria
 Dreamteam (2021) as Akane
 Galápagos (2023)

Films 
 Classmates (2008) as Yuki Hayakawa
 Taiikukan Baby (2008) as Yuki Hayakawa
 Heaven's bus (2008)
 Akai Ito (2008) as Sara Nakagawa
 Summer Wars (2009) as Natsuki Shinohara
 Shodo Girls (2010)
 The Last Ronin (2010) as Kane
 Sabi Girls Sabi Boys (2011)
 Tengoku Kara no Yell (2011)
 Runway Beat (2011) as Mei Tsukamoto
 .hack//The Movie (2012) as Yūki Sora (voice)
 The After-Dinner Mysteries (2013)
 The Werewolf Game: The Villagers Side (2013) as Airi Nishina
 Attack On Titan (2015) as Sasha
 Attack On Titan : End of the World (2015) as Sasha
 Trumpetofthe Cliff (2016) as Aoi
 Manhunt (2017) as Rika
 Our Departures (2018) as Yuri Sasaki
 Yakiniku Dragon (2018) as Mika
 Midnight Horror: Six Nights  Segment: Order (2022) as May 
 Eternal New Mornings (2023) as Megumi Sasaki

Video games 
 The Centennial Case: A Shijima Story (2022) as Haruka Kagami

Other TV programs 
   (TBS)

CM 
Softbank Telecom
Suntoryfoods Nacchan Orange (23 February 2010)
 Lotte Ghana Milk Chocolate (April 19, 2010)
 National Fire Prevention poster campaign in spring (2010)
Japan Post Bank"Yucho Kazoku"(2010)
Mitsubishi Estate"Mitsubishi Jisho Wo Mini Ikou"(2010)
Lawson (2015)
Izumi Syuzou (2016)

Radio 
SCHOOL OF LOCK! "GIRLS LOCKS!"(Tokyo FM)

Music Videos 
Exo's For Life Music Video (Korean and Mandarin Version) (2016)

Awards and nominations

See also
bump.y
Maki Horikita (same agency)
Meisa Kuroki (same agency)
Mirei Kiritani (same agency)
Nao Minamisawa (same agency)
Sara Takatsuki (same agency)

References

External links 
  Official website
 
 

1992 births
Japanese gravure idols
Living people
People from Kagoshima Prefecture
Musicians from Kagoshima Prefecture
21st-century Japanese actresses